Clarence Earl Gideon (August 30, 1910 – January 18, 1972) was a poor drifter accused in a Florida state court of felony breaking and entering. While in prison, he appealed his case to the US Supreme Court, resulting in the landmark 1963 decision Gideon v. Wainwright holding that a criminal defendant who cannot afford to hire a lawyer must be provided one at no cost.

At Gideon's first trial in August 1961, he was denied legal counsel and was forced to represent himself, and was convicted. After the Supreme Court ruled in Gideon that the state had to provide defense counsel in criminal cases at no cost to the indigent, Florida retried Gideon. At his second trial, which took place in August 1963, with a court-appointed lawyer representing him and bringing out for the jury the weaknesses in the prosecution's case, Gideon was acquitted.

Early life
Clarence Earl Gideon was born in Hannibal, Missouri. His father, Charles Roscoe Gideon, died when he was three. His mother, Virginia Gregory Gideon, married Marrion Anderson shortly after. Gideon, after years of defiant behavior and chronic truancy, quit school after eighth grade, aged 14, and ran away from home, becoming a homeless drifter. By the time he was sixteen, Gideon had begun compiling a petty crime profile.

He was arrested in Missouri and charged with robbery, burglary, and larceny. Gideon was sentenced to 10 years but released after three, in 1932, as the Great Depression was beginning.

Gideon spent most of the next three decades in poverty. He served additional prison terms at Leavenworth, Kansas, for stealing government property; in Missouri for stealing, larceny, and escape; and in Texas for theft.

Between his prison terms, Gideon was married four times. The first three marriages ended quickly, but the fourth to Ruth Ada Babineaux in October 1955 endured. They settled in Orange, Texas, in the mid-1950s. Gideon found irregular work as a tugboat laborer and bartender until he was bedridden by tuberculosis for three years.

In addition to the three children that Ruth already had, Gideon and Ruth had three others, born in 1956, 1957, and 1959: the first two in Orange, the third after the family had moved to Panama City, Florida. The six children were later removed by welfare authorities. Gideon worked as an electrician in Florida but began gambling for money because of his low wages. He did not serve more time in jail until 1961.

Criminal life

Arrest
On June 3, 1961, $5 in change and a few bottles of beer and soda were stolen from the Pool Room, a pool hall and beer bar that belonged to Ira Strickland Jr. Strickland also alleged that $50 was taken from the jukebox ($437 in 2022 terms). Henry Cook, a 22-year-old resident who lived nearby, told the police that he had seen Gideon walk out of the bar with a bottle of wine and his pockets filled with coins, and then get into a cab. Gideon was later arrested at a tavern.

First trial
Too poor to afford counsel, Gideon was forced to defend himself at his trial after being denied a lawyer by the trial judge, Robert McCrary Jr. At the time, Florida law only gave indigent defendants no-cost legal counsel in death penalty cases.  On August 4, 1961, Gideon was convicted of breaking with intent to commit petty larceny, and on August 25, Judge McCrary gave Gideon the maximum sentence, five years in state prison.

Gideon v. Wainwright
 
While incarcerated, Gideon studied the American legal system. He concluded that Judge McCrary had violated his constitutional right to counsel under the Sixth Amendment to the United States Constitution, applicable to Florida through the due process clause of the Fourteenth Amendment to the United States Constitution. He then wrote to an FBI office in Florida and then to the Florida Supreme Court, but was denied assistance. In January 1962, he mailed a five-page petition for writ of certiorari to the Supreme Court of the United States, asking the nine justices to consider his case. The Supreme Court agreed to hear his appeal. The case was originally called Gideon v. Cochran and was argued on January 15, 1963. Gideon v. Cochran was changed to Gideon v. Wainwright after Louie L. Wainwright replaced H. G. Cochran as the director of the Florida Department of Corrections.

Abe Fortas (later a Supreme Court justice himself) was assigned to represent Gideon. Florida Assistant Attorney General Bruce Jacob was assigned to argue against Gideon. Fortas argued that a common man with no training in law could not go up against a trained lawyer and win, and that "you cannot have a fair trial without counsel." Jacob argued that the issue at hand was a state issue, not federal; the practice of only appointing counsel under "special circumstances" in non-capital cases sufficed; that thousands of convictions would have to be thrown out if it were changed; and that Florida had followed for 21 years "in good faith" the 1942 Supreme Court ruling in Betts v. Brady.

The Supreme Court ruled unanimously in Gideon's favor in a landmark decision on March 18, 1963.

Second trial
Although about 2,000 convicted persons in Florida alone were freed as a result of the Gideon decision, Gideon himself was not freed but was instead to receive a retrial.

After the decision, Abe Fortas wrote to Gideon suggesting that a Florida lawyer represent him for his retrial in a Florida court.  Fortas arranged for a lawyer from Miami who worked with the Florida Civil Liberties Union, and this lawyer also recruited a second Miami lawyer who was an experienced criminal lawyer.

However, in the court of Judge Robert McCrary in Panama City, Gideon said he did not want the Miami lawyers.  Asked who he wanted, he said he wanted local lawyer Fred Turner.  Turner agreed, and the judge scheduled the retrial for one month later on August 5, 1963 (this would be five months after the Supreme Court decision). Judge McCrary also offered to release him on $1,000 bail, but Gideon could not raise the money.

During the trial, Turner picked apart the testimony of eyewitness Henry Cook. Turner also brought out that Cook had lied in the first trial about not having a criminal conviction. And in his closing statement, Turner suggested that Cook had likely been the lookout for a group of young men who had stolen the beer and coins from the Bay Harbor Pool Room. (Turner had in fact been Cook's lawyer in previous cases.)

Police Detective Duell Pitts referred to his notes and stated that the following had been stolen from the Bay Harbor Poolroom: 4 fifths of wine, 12 bottles of Coca-Cola, 12 cans of beer, approximately $5 from the cigarette machine, and approximately $60 from the juke box.  All of the money was in coins.  Detective Pitts stated that Gideon had approximately $25 of coins on him when arrested.

Turner also received a statement from the cab driver who transported Gideon from the phone booth outside Henderson’s Grocery & Market to a bar in Panama City, stating that Gideon was carrying neither wine, beer, nor Coca-Cola when he picked him up, even though Cook testified that he watched Gideon walk from the pool hall to the phone, then wait for a cab. However, the driver did testify that Gideon paid for the ride with six quarters.

The Prosecution brought out that Gideon had said to the cab driver, “If anyone asks where you left me off, you don’t know, you haven’t seen me.”  The Defense brought out that Gideon had said the same thing on other occasions, with the cab driver saying, “I understand it was his wife — he had trouble with his wife.” And this part about Gideon saying the same thing previously had not been brought out in the first trial.

The jury acquitted Gideon after an hour of deliberation.

Anthony Lewis wrote, “Gideon’s insistence on having a local lawyer — Fred Turner — may well have won the case for him.  It is doubtful that the Civil Liberties Union lawyers from Miami could have been so effective with a Panama City jury.

Legacy
In 1963, Robert F. Kennedy remarked about the case:

Later life
After his acquittal, Gideon resumed his previous way of life and later married for the fifth time. He died of cancer in Fort Lauderdale, Florida, on January 18, 1972, at age 61. Gideon's family had him buried in an unmarked grave in Hannibal. The local chapter of the American Civil Liberties Union later added a granite headstone, inscribed with a quote from a letter Gideon wrote to his attorney, Abe Fortas: "Each era finds an improvement in law for the benefit of mankind."

Portrayal on film
Gideon was portrayed by Henry Fonda in the 1980 made-for-television film Gideon's Trumpet, based on Anthony Lewis' book of the same name. The film was the first telecast as part of the Hallmark Hall of Fame anthology series, and co-starred Jose Ferrer as Abe Fortas, the attorney who pleaded Gideon's right to have a lawyer in the US Supreme Court. Fonda was nominated for an Emmy Award for his portrayal of Gideon.

See also
Miranda v. Arizona (1966)

References

External links
State of Florida vs Clarence Earl Gideon (transcript of second trial, August 5, 1963) from Florida's Fourteenth Judicial Circuit.  Prosecution: eyewitness Henry Cook, page 2; bar manager Ira Strickland, Jr., page 61; Police Detective Duell Pitts, page 84; cab driver Preston Bray, page 92.  Defense: grocery store manager J. D. Henderson, page 102; defendant Clarence Gideon, page 112.  Prosecution recalled cab driver Preston Bray for re-direct, page 130; re-crossed by Defense, page 131.

Clarence Earl Gideon, Petitioner, vs. Louis L. Wainwright, Director, Department of Corrections, Respondent

1910 births
1972 deaths
American people convicted of burglary
Burials in Missouri
Homeless people
People from Hannibal, Missouri
People from Panama City, Florida
Deaths from cancer in Florida
Wrongful convictions